Stylactis is a genus of hydrozoans belonging to the family Hydractiniidae.

The species of this genus are found in Europe and Northern America.

Species:

Stylactaria hooperii 
Stylactis fucicola 
Stylactis inermis

References

Hydractiniidae
Hydrozoan genera